Stanley Milton Rees (February 25, 1899 – August 30, 1937), nicknamed "Nellie", was a Major League Baseball pitcher who played with the Washington Senators in .

External links

1899 births
1937 deaths
Major League Baseball pitchers
Baseball players from Kentucky
Washington Senators (1901–1960) players
Jersey City Skeeters players
Cynthiana Merchants players